FDP may refer to:

Biology and medicine 
 Fibrin degradation product
 Fixed-dose procedure
 Flexor digitorum profundus muscle
 Fructose 1,6-bisphosphate

Political parties 
 Free Democratic Party (Germany) in the Federal Republic of Germany
 FDP.The Liberals, in Switzerland
 Fancy Dress Party
 Fiji Democratic Party
 Florida Democratic Party in the United States
 Free Democratic Party (disambiguation)
 Popular Democratic Front (Italy)

Other uses 
 Federation of Deaf People, a British rights organisation
 Fiji's Daily Post, a defunct newspaper
 Foundry Discovery Protocol
 Fresh Del Monte Produce, an American produce company
 Fútbol de Primera (disambiguation)
 Sons of Divine Providence, a Roman Catholic religious order
 Fuerzas de Defensa de Panama — Panama Defense Forces